The Women's 30 kilometre freestyle competition at the FIS Nordic World Ski Championships 2019 was held on 2 March 2019.

Results
The race was started at 12:15.

References

Women's 30 kilometre freestyle